This article concerns the period 359 BC – 350 BC.

References